Sri Lanka Army Sports Club or Army SC May refer to:

  Sri Lanka Army Sports Club (cricket)
  Sri Lanka Army Sports Club (football)
  Sri Lanka Army Sports Club (rugby)